The Secretariat of the Central Committee of the Communist Party of Vietnam, replaced by the Politburo Standing Committee of the Central Committee in the period 1996 to 2001, is the highest implementation body of the Communist Party of Vietnam (CPV) between Central Committee meetings. According to Party rules, the Secretariat implements the decisions of the Politburo and the Central Committee.

The members of the Politburo are elected (and given a ranking) by the Central Committee in the immediate aftermath of a National Party Congress. The current Secretariat, the 12th, was elected by the Central Committee in the aftermath of the 13th National Congress and consists of 9 members. The first-ranked member is Nguyễn Phú Trọng, the General Secretary of the Central Committee.

 
Secretariats of communist parties
Lists of political office-holders in Vietnam